Castlebar is the county town of County Mayo, Ireland. Developing around a 13th century castle of the de Barry family, from which the town got its name, the town now acts as a social and economic focal point for the surrounding hinterland. With a population of 12,318 in the 2011 census (up from 3,698 in the 1911 census), Castlebar was one of the fastest growing town in Ireland in the early 21st century. 

A campus of Atlantic Technological University and the Country Life section of the National Museum are two important facilities in the area. The town is linked by railway to Dublin, Westport and Ballina. The main route by road is the N5.

History

The modern town grew up as a settlement around the de Barry castle, which was built by a Norman adventurer in 1235 and was later the site of an English garrison. The castle was located at the end of Castle Street, where the town river is thought to have originally flowed. Castlebar Military Barracks operated in the town for many years: it was finally closed in March 2012 and the buildings and grounds have been purchased by the local town and county councils. Armed conflict has been the centrepiece of the town's historical heritage. French forces under the command of General Humbert aided in a rout of the British garrison in the town during the failed Irish Rebellion of 1798, which was so comprehensive it would later be known as "The Races of Castlebar". A short-lived provisional Irish Republic had been declared upon General Humbert's arrival at Killala. Following the victory at Castlebar John Moore, head of the Mayo United Irishmen and the brother of a local landowner, was declared president of the Province of Connacht. His remains are today interred in a corner of the town green, known as the Mall, previously the cricket grounds of Lord Lucan, whose family (the Binghams) have owned and still own large tracts of the town and county. The town received its charter from King James I in 1613, and is today governed by Mayo County Council. The Lake in Castlebar is also known as Lough Lannagh.

The Irish National Land League was founded by Michael Davitt, of Straide in County Mayo, at the Imperial Hotel in Castlebar on 21 October 1879.

The name of the town comes from the castle built in 1235 (see above). This castle is depicted in the top of the crest, with two yew trees on either side because Castlebar is the county town of Mayo. The crosses represent the parish of Aglish (the official name of the parish of Castlebar). The 1798 'Races of Castlebar' is commemorated with the Pikes in the top left-hand corner. Underneath, the words 'Ar Aghaidh' can be found, which means 'Forward'.

Demographics

Castlebar expanded rapidly during the 1980s, 1990s and 2000s. Castlebar's population grew in the late 1990s, rising by one-third in the six years between the 1996 and 2002 census. According to the 2016 census, the population stood at 12,068, a fourfold increase in the 90 years since 1926, when the population of Castlebar was 4,256.

Culture

Castlebar is the location for important festivals and traditions, among which is the International Four Days' Walk. A well-established blues music festival in venues across the town took place for many years on the weekend before the first Monday in June, but has not taken place since 2011. During the 1970s and 1980s the town hosted the International Castlebar Song Contest which was televised nationally on RTÉ. The Museum of Country Life is located on the outskirts of Castlebar, and is the only branch of the National Museum of Ireland located outside Dublin.

Castlebar is home to The Linenhall Arts Centre, which exhibits visual art throughout the year, as well as hosting live drama and music performances. The Linenhall also organises an annual children's arts festival called Roola Boola (an anglicisation of the Irish phrase rí rá agus ruaile buaile which in this context means "boisterous fun"). The Royal Theatre and Event Centre, with a capacity of two thousand two hundred fully seated, four thousand standing, hosts larger-scale productions and popular music concerts.

There are Roman Catholic, Church of Ireland (Anglican), Elim Pentecostal, and evangelical (Calvary Church Castlebar) churches in the town. There are also several spiritualist gatherings. There is also a male voice choir, the Mayo Concert Orchestra, and a marching band in the town.

Entertainment
Restaurants in Castlebar include Italian, Indian, Chinese, Irish, Polish and fast food restaurants, as well as several cafés.

A lot of the public houses closed during the building boom in the 1990s. In 1990, Castlebar had 54 licensed premises, although this number had fallen to fewer than 30 public houses by 2008. 
One of the oldest pubs in Castlebar is John McHale's pub, located on New Line. The pub is known for its sale of a Meejum of Guinness, which is slightly less than a pint. It once had 'the best pint of Guinness in Ireland' according to a national tabloid.

Economy

Castlebar is traditionally a market town, and it is still a destination for shoppers from all over the west of Ireland.

Castlebar is also home to the health care company Baxter Healthcare and manufacturer Fort Wayne Metals.

Transport

Road

Castlebar is served by the N5 national primary road and the N60 and N84 national secondary roads. In 1990 a relief road was built around Castlebar, removing through traffic on the N5 from the main street. This road is a basic two-lane road. It suffers from chronic congestion, particularly in the summer months when thousands of tourists have to negotiate the bottleneck en route to neighbouring Westport and Achill Island. A bypass of Castlebar of dual-carriageway standard was approved by An Bórd Pleanala in July 2014, and construction began in late 2019.

Rail
Castlebar railway station is a station on the Dublin to Westport service. Passengers can travel to Ballina and Foxford by travelling to Manulla Junction and changing trains

The station opened on 17 December 1862.

Old airport
Castlebar used to have a commercial airport; the site where it once stood is now occupied by Castlebar Retail Park. The airport's IATA code was CLB and its ICAO code was EICB.

Education

In addition to a number of national (primary) schools, Castlebar's secondary schools include St Gerald's College (a De La Salle boys school), St Joseph's Secondary School (a girls school), and Davitt College (a mixed vocational school).

Third level and further education colleges in the town include Atlantic TU's Mayo campus (formerly Galway-Mayo Institute of Technology), the Mayo, Sligo & Leitrim Education and Training Board, and Castlebar College of Further Education.

Sport

GAA

The local Gaelic football and hurling team is the Castlebar Mitchels GAA club. Throughout its history, the club has won over 30 Mayo Senior Football Championship titles and two Mayo Senior Hurling Championship titles. The club reached the All-Ireland Senior Club Football Championship final in 2014 and 2016. Other nearby GAA clubs include Breaffy GAA, Parke GAA, Islandeady GAA and Ballyvary Hurling Club.

MacHale Park in Castlebar is one of the larger GAA grounds in Ireland, with a capacity of approximately 28,000. In the early 21st century, the Mayo county board oversaw the building of a new stand with dressing rooms and offices underneath and a plan to add fifteen extra rows of seating to the 'Albany' end.

Soccer
Local soccer teams include Castlebar Celtic F.C., which was established in 1924. As of 2014, it had a team playing in the Mayo Super League and a senior women's side playing in the Continental Women's National League. There is also a youth program which provides teams from under 10s to under 18s for boys and under 14 to under 17 for girls, as well as an under 8 academy. They play their home games in Celtic Park, in the centre of the town. Castlebar Town FC were formed in the 1970s (as Castlebar United) as an alternative to Celtic. Other local teams include Snugboro United, Ballyheane FC, Manulla FC and Ballyvary Blue Bombers.

Rugby
Castlebar RFC, a rugby union club and one of the original founding members of the Connacht branch of the IRFU in 1885, reformed 1928 and again revived in the 1970s. Its grounds are located at Cloondeash on the outskirts of the town, with two pitches and a club house. The club, which plays in a navy and light blue strip, participates in provincial (Connacht Junior League Div.1B) and national league competitions. Castlebar won the Cawley Cup in 2009 and reached the final in 2017. The ladies team, which was formed in 2012, won the Connacht Development League Final in November 2013.

Other sports
There is an 18-hole golf club in the town, as well as athletics, basketball, racquetball, tennis and other clubs. The council provides an indoor heated swimming pool and there are numerous gyms.

There are also several martial arts clubs teaching a variety of disciplines including Karate, Kickboxing, Savate, Krav Maga, Haedong Kumdo, Ninjitsu and Tai Chi. Castlebar played host to the WOMAA World Martial Games in both 2007 and 2008 which saw hundreds of competitors from all over the world competing over the three-day event.

Annalistic references
The Annals of the Four Masters contain a few references to the Castlebar area, then known as Claenglais:
 1524. Great inclemency of weather, and mortality of cattle, in the beginning of the year.
 M1535.8. Mac Auliffe gained a great battle, in which were slain the Lord of Claenglais and Mac Gibbon, with a large battalion of the Clann-Sheehy. Maelmurry, son of Brian Mac Sweeny, was slain in the commencement and fury of the conflict.
 1576. 13. Edmond Mac William Burke, of Castlebar, joined the sons of the Earl; and the consequence to him was, that the Lord Justice took Castlebar from him, and banished himself, with his wife and children, into Clanrickard.

Notable people

 Ulick Bourke (1829–1877), scholar; founder of the Gaelic Union
 Enoch Burke, anti-LGBT activist 
 Louis Brennan (1852–1932), inventor
 Margaret Burke-Sheridan (1889–1958), opera singer
 Pádraig Carney (1928–2019), a Gaelic footballer who was known as the "Flying Doctor"
 Michael Feeney, chairman and founder of Mayo Peace Park Garden
 Pádraig Flynn (born 1939), former government minister and European Commissioner
 Charles Haughey (1925–2006), former Taoiseach
 John Hennen FRSE (1779–1828), military surgeon
 Enda Kenny (born 1951), former Taoiseach
 Mark Mellett (born 1958), former Chief of Staff of the Irish Defence Forces
 John MacHale (1789–1881), Archbishop of Tuam, Irish independence leader
 Ernie O'Malley (1897–1957), prominent officer in the Irish Republican Army during the Irish War of Independence and on the anti-Treaty side in the Irish Civil War; also a writer
 William Joyce Sewell (1835–1901), Unionist colonel during the American Civil War, US senator from New Jersey
 Sally Rooney (born 1991), novelist and screenwriter

Twin towns – sister cities

Castlebar is twinned with:
 Dixon, United States
 Höchstadt an der Aisch, Germany
 Peekskill, United States

See also
 List of towns and villages in Ireland
 Museum of Country Life, Castlebar, County Mayo
 Murders of Jack and Tommy Blaine

References

External links

 Official Castlebar website

 
County towns in the Republic of Ireland
Towns and villages in County Mayo